= Wally Zenner =

Argentine poet and translator (1905–1996)

María Julia “Wally” Zenner (1905–1996) was an Argentine poet and translator. She was born in Buenos Aires. She studied declamation (poetry recitation) under Alemany Villa and became one of Buenos Aires’ prominent reciters in the 1920s.

She was also a writer and published several works:

- Encuentro en el allá seguro
- Antigua lumbre
- Moradas de la pena altiva
- Vocación de alabanza

Jorge Luis Borges was an intimate of Zenner, and wrote a preface to Encuentro en el allá seguro.

Zenner's brother was the actor Rodolfo Zenner.
